Crangonyx grandimanus is a species of crustacean in family Crangonyctidae. It is endemic to the United States.

References

Sources

Crustaceans of the United States
Gammaridea
Crustaceans described in 1963
Taxonomy articles created by Polbot